Gyrokinetics is a theoretical framework to study plasma behavior on perpendicular spatial scales comparable to the gyroradius and frequencies much lower than the particle cyclotron frequencies. 
These particular scales have been experimentally shown to be appropriate for modeling plasma turbulence. The trajectory of charged particles in a magnetic field is a helix that winds around the field line. This trajectory can be decomposed into a relatively slow motion of the guiding center along the field line and a fast circular motion, called gyromotion. For most plasma behavior, this gyromotion is irrelevant. Averaging over this gyromotion reduces the equations to six dimensions (3 spatial, 2 velocity, and time) rather than the seven (3 spatial, 3 velocity, and time). Because of this simplification, gyrokinetics governs the evolution of charged rings with a guiding center position, instead of gyrating charged particles.

Derivation of the gyrokinetic equation 

Fundamentally, the gyrokinetic model assumes the plasma is strongly magnetized, the perpendicular spatial scales are comparable to the gyroradius, and the behavior of interest has low frequencies. We must also expand the distribution function, and assume the perturbation is small compared to the background. The starting point is the Fokker–Planck equation and Maxwell's equations. The first step is to change spatial variables from the particle position  to the guiding center position .

The electrostatic gyrokinetic equation, in the absence of large plasma flow, is given by

.

Here the first term represents the change in the perturbed distribution function, with time. The second term represents particle streaming along the magnetic field line. The third term contains the effects of cross-field particle drifts, including the curvature drift, the grad-B drift, and the lowest order E-cross-B drift. The fourth term represents the nonlinear effect of the perturbed  drift interacting with the distribution function perturbation. The fifth term uses a collision operator to include the effects of collisions between particles. The sixth term represents the Maxwell–Boltzmann response to the perturbed electric potential. The last term includes temperature and density gradients of the background distribution function, which drive the perturbation.

The gyrokinetic equation, together with gyro-averaged Maxwell's equations, give the distribution function and the perturbed electric and magnetic fields. In the electrostatic case we only require Gauss's law (which takes the form of the quasineutrality condition), given by

.

Usually solutions are found numerically with the help of supercomputers, but in simplified situations analytic solutions are possible.

See also 
 GYRO - a computational plasma physics code
 Gyrokinetic ElectroMagnetic - a gyrokinetic plasma turbulence simulation
 List of plasma (physics) articles

Notes

References 

 J.B. Taylor and R.J. Hastie, Stability of general plasma equilibria - I formal theory. Plasma Phys. 10:479, 1968.
 P.J. Catto, Linearized gyro-kinetics. Plasma Physics, 20(7):719, 1978.
 R.G. LittleJohn, Journal of Plasma Physics Vol 29 pp. 111, 1983.
 J.R. Cary and R.G.Littlejohn, Annals of Physics Vol 151, 1983.
 T.S. Hahm, Physics of Fluids Vol 31 pp. 2670, 1988.
 A.J. Brizard and T.S. Hahm, Foundations of Nonlinear Gyrokinetic Theory, Rev. Modern Physics 79, PPPL-4153, 2006.
 X. Garbet and M. Lesur, Gyrokinetics, hal-03974985, 2023.

External links
 GS2: A numerical continuum code for the study of turbulence in fusion plasmas.
 AstroGK: A code based on GS2 (above) for studying turbulence in astrophysical plasmas.
 GENE: A semi-global continuum turbulence simulation code, for fusion plasmas.
 GEM: A particle in cell turbulence code, for fusion plasmas.
 GKW: A semi-global continuum gyrokinetic code, for turbulence in fusion plasmas.
 GYRO: A semi-global continuum turbulence code, for fusion plasmas.
 GYSELA: A semi-lagrangian code, for turbulence in fusion plasmas.
 ELMFIRE: Particle in cell monte-carlo code, for fusion plasmas.
 GT5D: A global continuum code, for turbulence in fusion plasmas.
 ORB5 Global particle in cell code, for electromagnetic turbulence in fusion plasmas.
 (d)FEFI: Homepage for the author of continuum gyrokinetic codes, for turbulence in fusion plasmas.
 GKV: A local continuum gyrokinetic code, for turbulence in fusion plasmas.
 GTC: A global gyrokinetic particle in cell simulation for fusion plasmas in toroidal and cylindrical geometries.

Kinetics (physics)
Plasma physics
Theoretical physics